The Devil’s Heart is the title of a 1993 non-canon Star Trek: The Next Generation novel by Carmen Carter, and the name of a legendary object of unsurpassed power and mystery which appears in that novel.

Plot summary
The novel primarily explores the consequences of Captain Jean-Luc Picard's possession of—and near-possession by—a legendary object of power.

Object

“The Devil’s Heart” is the Federation Standard (Standard English) translation of the Vulcan word “Ko N’ya” provided by Lieutenant Commander Data upon completing his research of the origin and history of the object.

The Devil's Heart, or the Heart, is an incredibly ancient artifact that has shaped the histories of a number of Alpha and Beta Quadrant cultures during its long existence. Appearing as a small stone, the object was an extremely advanced device.

It had many names during its travels through the galaxy.  To the Iconians it was known as the Dream Gem. To the Vulcans it was known as Ko N'ya while the Romulans knew it as the Bloodstone.  The stone was known as the Master of All Stories to the El-Aurian people.  The Andorians knew it as Telev's Bane and the Belnarri knew it as Nota.  The Klingons knew it as the Pagrashtak.

Origins
The Heart was originally created by the same race that built the Guardian of Forever.  They intended to send the stone on a journey to a different galaxy, where the stone would grow into a second Guardian of Forever.  However this race died out before they could see that the stone reached its destination, and the stone was unable to complete its journey.

Over time, the Heart ended up in the hands of a number of different races, and was known by a variety of names. The Heart crash landed on the surface of the Tkon home world, and what were the primitive Tkon people used the Heart's power to create a vast interstellar empire that ultimately collapsed.  The Heart was later possessed by the Iconian people until their home world was destroyed 200,000 years ago.  It also figured in early Vulcan history - Surak's family had possession of the Heart until it was taken by a rival clan.  When the leader of the rival clan left Vulcan, he took the Heart with him to Romulus where the Heart became part of Romulan history. The Andorians acquired the stone when the ship carrying the Romulan Emperor crashed on Andor - an Andorian healer used the Heart's power to stop a plague which was devastating the Andorian people.  It was later given to the Ferengi - the Ferengi were unaware of the Heart's powers, and sealed it in a cargo bay until they reached Qo'noS and traded it with primitive Klingons. The ailing Klingon emperor Kessec gave the stone to his slave, who used the stone to found an artist's colony - and she entombed herself alive with the Heart. Afterwards, the stone remained sealed in the tomb, and the colony disbanded and was forgotten.

Reappearance
In 2368, the Vulcan archaeologist T'Sara rediscovered the Heart. This resulted in a deadly race in which each species that had held the stone before attempted to reacquire the artifact.

Captain Jean-Luc Picard discovered the Heart on a wrecked Ferengi ship. The Heart began communicating with Picard a short time later by sending him visions of its journeys via Picard's dreams. Picard and the Enterprise crew were able to see the Heart safely through a wormhole to a distant galaxy, where the Heart would someday find a suitable planet and grow into a new Guardian of Forever.

Footnotes

External links

1993 American novels
Novels based on Star Trek: The Next Generation